Russell Leonce is a singer-songwriter who has gained an international reputation in contemporary Christian music.  His songs are meant to encourage faith and inspiration, particularly in young people.  Indeed, Leonce, a born-again Christian, is a Music Minister on the Church of the Nazarene Trinidad and Tobago District, and is also a graduate of Caribbean Nazarene College (CNC) with a Bachelor of Arts Degree in Theology.

In late 2008, Leonce released his debut single, Troubles won’t last, which earned him raving reviews when he performed at the Copyright Music Organization of Trinidad and Tobago (COTT) Music Awards that year.  In March 2009, Leonce released his debut album, A Culture of Love, for which he received wide acclaim at the Miami Music Festival in December 2009.  The Album would win him the Gospel Album category of the Independent Music Awards. in January 2010 and garner 10 nominations at the Caribbean Gospel Music Marlin Awards, eventually winning 3 awards.

In April 2013, Leonce released his latest single, Yet Will I .

Leonce is the son of Church of the Nazarene Windward Islands District Superintendent George N. Leonce and his wife, Lynne.  He has four siblings Lisa, Gerard, Jeremy, and Christabel.

Discography

2009 "Stand Up"
2009 "This Love (Culture of Love)"
2009 "Why I Love You (Got to Tell Ya)"
2009 "Smile"
2009 "Grateful"
2009 "Culturelude 2 (Retro Funk)"
2009 "Troubles Won’t Last"
2009 "Culturelude 3 (Church)"
2009 "I Am"
2009 "L-I-V-E" 
2009 "Runaway Child"
2009 "Don't Cry"
2009 "Unchanging"
2013 Yet Will I

Charts 
SONG - Top 20 Gospel Songs (Caribbean)

Awards
""Independent Music Awards""
 9th Annual Independent Music Awards Winner 2010 (Gospel Category)
2010 Vox Pop Poll Award Winner (People's Choice)

2010 Caribbean Gospel Music Marlin Awards
 Contemporary Vocal Performance of the Year
Male Individual for  "L.I.V.E.", Contemporary Recording of the Year for "Smile" 
Packaging of the Year for the Album, "Culture of Love"

Music videos
Troubles won’t last: https://www.youtube.com/watch?v=_UAV79oY4Ek  
Unchanging: https://www.youtube.com/watch?v=BuVXHmRUb1I
Yet Will I: https://www.youtube.com/watch?v=XiCndYrP-Ks

References

External links
 — official website of Russell Leonce
 Gospel Globe Interview  
 Caribbean Beat Interview  
http://chemagazine.com/News/tabid/61/articleType/ArticleView/articleId/32/Russell-Leonce-on-the-Success-of-Debut-Album-Culture-of-Love.aspx
http://upstreammagazine.com/?section=Singles%20Plus&mid=3001&articleID=A5DC27
http://faith.urbanham.com/site/index.php/2010/01/top-20-gospel-songs-of-2009/

Living people
Christian music songwriters
21st-century Trinidad and Tobago male singers
21st-century Trinidad and Tobago singers
1978 births